Something Leather is a novel-in-stories by Alasdair Gray which was published in 1990. Its framing narrative is the story of June's initiation into sado-masochistic activities by the female operators of a leather clothing shop in Glasgow.

The four central characters are from different social groups: June works for the civil service; Donalda is a dressmaker, and Senga her employer; and Harry (Harriet) is an aristocratic English artist and dominatrix. The novel also features a large cast of Glaswegian minor characters across a broad social spectrum, some of the segments reworked from Gray's earlier broadcast material.

Something Leather concludes with a section entitled Critic Fuel - An Epilogue, in which Gray describes the circumstances surrounding the book's development and offers an extended ending. He comments in the Acknowledgements that the title made reviewers treat it as "a sadomasochistic Lesbian adventure story" (these events only take place in the framing Chapters 1 and 12) and that had he called it Glaswegians they might have paid more attention to the rest of the book. Indeed, when Something Leather was collected as part of Every Short Story 1951-2012 (Canongate, 2012), the collection was grouped under the title Glaswegians, and some of the stronger sadomasochistic elements were dropped.

Gray said that the novel was born out of an attempt to write a story about a woman (an idea he credits to Kathy Acker) since his previous books had been about "men who found life a task they never doubted until an unexpected collision opened their eyes and changed their habits." Since this happens to June in Something Leather, it can be read as a female equivalent to Gray's 1984 novel 1982, Janine.

There are many comparisons to be made between the two novels. The texts have similar multiple openings and conclusions in common with their intertext, Story of O. Contrasts include Jock's lesbian fantasy in 1982, Janine taking real form in Something Leather, and apparently inconsequential details such as the prominence of white clothes in the former and black leathers in the latter.


Reception

Critical reception
The novel received mixed reviews.

Commercial reception
Gray has referred to the book as having "[sold] badly".

References

External links
Something Leather at the Lanark 1982 unofficial Alasdair Gray website

1990 British novels
BDSM literature
Leather subculture
Novels by Alasdair Gray
Novels set in Glasgow
Canongate Books books